Ctesias is a genus of beetles in the family Dermestidae, the skin beetles. They are distributed in the Palearctic, including Europe. There are about 23 species.

Species include:

 Ctesias dusmae Beal, 1960
 Ctesias fasciata Zhantiev, 1975
 Ctesias gemma Zhantiev, 1976
 Ctesias hajeki Háva, 2005
 Ctesias hebei Háva, 2004
 Ctesias intermedia Mroczkowski, 1961
 Ctesias iranica Háva, 2005
 Ctesias kaliki Mroczkowski, 1961
 Ctesias klapperichi (Pic, 1954)
 Ctesias maculifasciata Reitter, 1899
 Ctesias morocco Háva, 2000
 Ctesias nuratavica Sokolov, 1983
 Ctesias orientalis Zhantiev, 1988
 Ctesias schawalleri Háva, 2002
 Ctesias serra (Fabricius, 1792) – cobweb beetle
 Ctesias similis Háva, 2005
 Ctesias sogdiana Zhantiev, 1975
 Ctesias syriaca Ganglbauer, 1904
 Ctesias tschuiliensis Sokolov, 1972
 Ctesias variegata Arrow, 1915

References

External links
Ctesias at Fauna Europaea

Dermestidae genera
Palearctic insects